The America Zone was one of the three regional zones of the 1963 Davis Cup.

7 teams entered the America Zone, with the winner going on to compete in the Inter-Zonal Zone against the winners of the Eastern Zone and Europe Zone. The United States defeated Venezuela in the final and progressed to the Inter-Zonal Zone.

Draw

Quarterfinals

Ecuador vs. Caribbean/West Indies

Iran vs. United States

Canada vs. Mexico

Semifinals

Venezuela vs. Ecuador

United States vs. Mexico

Final

United States vs. Venezuela

References

External links
Davis Cup official website

Davis Cup Americas Zone
America Zone
Davis Cup